The AERMOD atmospheric dispersion modeling system is an integrated system that includes three modules:

A steady-state dispersion model designed for short-range (up to 50 kilometers) dispersion of direct air pollutant emissions primarily from stationary industrial sources.
 A meteorological data preprocessor (AERMET) that accepts surface meteorological data, upper air soundings, and optionally, data from on-site instrument towers. It then calculates atmospheric parameters needed by the dispersion model, such as atmospheric turbulence characteristics, mixing heights, friction velocity, Monin-Obukov length and surface heat flux.
 A terrain preprocessor (AERMAP) whose main purpose is to provide a physical relationship between terrain features and the behavior of air pollution plumes. It generates location and height data for each receptor location.  It also provides information that allows the dispersion model to simulate the effects of air flowing over hills or splitting to flow around hills.

AERMOD also includes PRIME (Plume Rise Model Enhancements)  which is an algorithm  for modeling the effects of downwash created by the pollution plume flowing over nearby buildings.

History of the development of AERMOD

AERMOD was developed by the AERMIC (American Meteorological Society (AMS)/United States Environmental Protection Agency (EPA) Regulatory Model Improvement Committee), a collaborative working group of scientists from the AMS and the EPA. The AERMIC was initially formed in 1991.

The AERMIC developed AERMOD in seven steps:

Initial model formulation
Developmental evaluation
Internal peer review and beta testing
Revised model formulation
Performance evaluation and sensitivity testing
External peer review
Submission to the EPA for consideration as a regulatory model.

On April 21 of 2000, the EPA proposed that AERMOD be adopted as the EPA's preferred regulatory model for both simple and complex terrain. On November 9 of 2005, AERMOD was adopted by the EPA and promulgated as their preferred regulatory model, effective as of December 9 of 2005. The entire developmental and adoption process took 14 years (from 1991 to 2005).

Features and capabilities of AERMOD

Some of the primary features and capabilities of AERMOD are:

Source types: Multiple point, area and volume sources
Source releases: Surface, near surface and elevated sources
Source locations: Urban or rural locations. Urban effects are scaled by population.
Plume types: Continuous, buoyant plumes
Plume deposition: Dry or wet deposition of particulates and/or gases
Plume dispersion treatment: Gaussian model treatment in horizontal and in vertical for stable atmospheres. Non-Gaussian treatment in vertical for unstable atmospheres
Terrain types: Simple or complex terrain 
Building effects: Handled by PRIME downwash algorithms  
Meteorology data height levels: Accepts meteorology data from multiple heights
Meteorological data profiles: Vertical profiles of wind, turbulence and temperature are created

See also

Air pollution dispersion terminology
Atmospheric dispersion modeling
Bibliography of atmospheric dispersion modeling
List of atmospheric dispersion models
Useful conversions and formulas for air dispersion modeling

References

Further reading
For those who are unfamiliar with air pollution dispersion modelling and would like to learn more about the subject, it is suggested that either one of the following books be read:

 www.crcpress.com
 www.air-dispersion.com

External links
The EPA's download site for AERMOD (Model code, User's Guide and other material)
Brode, R.W., Implementation and Evaluation of the AERMOD-PRIME Model (AMS Conference, May 21, 2002)

Atmospheric dispersion modeling
Numerical climate and weather models
American Meteorological Society
United States Environmental Protection Agency